2014 S/S is the debut album of South Korean group Winner. It was released on August 12, 2014, by the group's record label, YG Entertainment. The members were credited for writing the lyrics and composing the majority of the album's songs.

Composition
The members produced the majority of the music for this album themselves, with the help of other producers such as Choice 37, B.I.,  Airplay, and others. The album was highlighted for incorporating elements generally absent from K-pop releases, including hints of acoustic and alternative rock.

Track listing

Reception
The title track "Empty" became a hit in South Korea, topping the Gaon Chart and Billboard's K-Pop Hot 100 chart. Internationally, 2014 S/S took the top spot in Billboard's World Album Chart.

Charts

Sales

References

External links 
 
 
 

2014 albums
YG Entertainment albums
Winner (band) albums
Korean-language albums